Lourdes "Lulu" Garcia-Navarro is an American journalist and an Opinion Audio podcast host for The New York Times. She was the host of National Public Radio's Weekend Edition Sunday from 2017 to 2021, when she left NPR after 17 years at the network. Previously a foreign correspondent, she served as NPR's Jerusalem bureau chief. Her coverage of the Israeli-Palestinian conflict and her vivid dispatches of the Arab Spring uprisings brought Garcia-Navarro wide acclaim and five awards in 2012, including the Edward R. Murrow and Peabody Awards for her coverage of the Libyan revolt. She then moved to Rio de Janeiro, Brazil, covering South America. Her series on the Amazon rainforest was a Peabody finalist and won an Edward R. Murrow award for best news series.

Early life and education
Garcia-Navarro was born in London, England. She has stated that her parents "are Cuban and Panamanian," and that she grew up in Miami. Garcia-Navarro "holds a Bachelor of Science degree in international relations from Georgetown University and an Master of Arts degree in journalism from City University in London".

Career 

She started her career working as a freelance journalist for the BBC World Service and Voice of America, traveling to Cuba, Syria, Panama and several European countries on assignment for the two organizations.

She was hired by Associated Press Television News as a producer in 1999 and later worked for the news agency's radio division. AP dispatched Garcia-Navarro to Kosovo in 1999; Colombia in 2000; Afghanistan in 2001; Israel in 2002; and Iraq from 2002 to 2004.

Garcia-Navarro traveled to Iraq on assignment before the 2003 war and was among the few journalists that covered the invasion as a unilateral reporter.

Garcia-Navarro joined National Public Radio in November 2004 as Mexico City bureau chief, and moved to Baghdad in January 2008 and oversaw NPR's Iraq coverage for more than a year. She then moved to Jerusalem to become bureau chief, a position that she held from April 2009 to the end of 2012. In the spring of 2009, she opened NPR's Brazil bureau in April 2013.

Garcia-Navarro was awarded the 2006 Daniel Schorr Journalism Prize for her work in Mexico, and belonged to teams that received the 2005 Peabody Award and the 2007 Alfred I. DuPont-Columbia University Silver Baton Award recognizing NPR's Iraq coverage.

In February 2011, Garcia-Navarro was one of the first reporters to report from eastern Libya as the uprising was gaining strength, and reported for months from rebel-held Benghazi, Tripoli, and the western mountains as rebel forces fought pitched battles against Col. Muammar Gaddafi's regime. Garcia-Navarro's front line reports made her among the most praised journalists covering the Arab Spring.

Besides the Murrow and Peabody awards, she received the 2012 City University in London XCity Award, the Outstanding Correspondent Gracie Award, and the Overseas Press Club Lowell Thomas Award.

From her base in Brazil, Garcia-Navarro covered political protests, the Zika virus and the Olympics. She became the new regular host of NPR's Weekend Edition Sunday on January 8, 2017, and later complemented that role by co-hosting the Saturday edition of the network's Up First podcast with Weekend Edition Saturday host Scott Simon.

On September 9, 2021, she announced she would leave NPR as of October 17, 2021. The New York Times Company announced on September 30, 2021, that Garcia-Navarro would join its Opinion Audio team to anchor a new podcast to "explore the personal side of opinion". The company further announced on May 19, 2022, that the podcast — First Person — would debut on June 9, 2022.

Personal life 
Garcia-Navarro is married to Times of London journalist James Hider. They have a daughter. In 2017, Garcia-Navarro became a US citizen.

Awards

 2005, with colleagues, a Peabody Award.
 2006 Daniel Schorr Journalism Prize, for reporting from Mexico.
 2007, with colleagues, the Alfred I. DuPont-Columbia University Silver Baton Award recognizing NPR's Iraq coverage.
 2011 Lowell Thomas Award of the Overseas Press Club.
 2012 Edward R. Murrow Award of the Radio Television Digital News Association, for coverage of the Israeli-Palestinian conflict and vivid dispatches from the Arab Spring uprisings. 
 2012 Peabody Award, for coverage of the Libyan revolt.
 2012 Gracie Award for Outstanding Correspondent.
 2012 City University in London XCity Award, an alumni award for coverage of the Arab Spring.

References

External links
NPR: Lulu Garcia-Navarro

 
American women journalists
NPR personalities
Year of birth missing (living people)
Living people
Journalists from London
20th-century American journalists
21st-century American journalists
Georgetown University alumni
Alumni of City, University of London
People with acquired American citizenship
20th-century American women
21st-century American women
Members of the Inter-American Dialogue